Sonia Ursu-Kim (born 24 July 1993 in Suceava, Romania) is a Romanian–South Korean professional basketball player. She plays as a shooting guard for the Romanian women's national basketball team and for Ślęza Wrocław in the Basket Liga Kobiet, in Poland.

Early years
Ursu was born to a South Korean engineer father who was working at a shipyard in Romania and to a Romanian mother. She spent the first years of her life in South Korea before returning to Romania when she started school in Suceava. In fourth grade, she moved to the capital Bucharest, where her mother opened a Korean restaurant. During this epoch, Ursu took piano lessons and practiced swimming. Later, she became interested in fashion and basketball. She can also speak fluently Korean.

Basketball career

Domestic
Despite getting several offers from college basketball teams in the United States, she decided to try her luck in South Korea. In October 2012, Ursu signed with Chuncheon Woori Bank Hansae in the WKBL. From 2014 to 2016, she played in the Romania-Liga Națională for both Olimpia CSU Brașov and CSU Alba Iulia. She signed for CEZ Nymburk ahead of the 2016–17 season. The following season she joined Ślęza Wrocław in Poland.

International
Ursu represents Romania internationally. She was part of the team that won the 2010 U18 European Division B Championship and played for the U20 at the 2013 U20 Division B Championship. She played in EuroBasket Women 2015, which Romania co-hosted. She played in all four of the team's group games, yet Romania failed to qualify from the group stage. She participated at the 2020 Summer Olympics.

Achievements
Women's Korean Basketball League:
Winner: 2013
Women's Korean Basketball Cup:
Winner: 2013
Women's Asian Basketball Cup:
Winner: 2013

References

External links
 Profile at basketball.asia-basket.com
 Profile at eurobasketwomen2013.com

1993 births
Living people
3x3 basketball players at the 2020 Summer Olympics
Basketball players at the 2015 European Games
European Games competitors for Romania
Olympic 3x3 basketball players of Romania
Sportspeople from Suceava
Romanian expatriates in South Korea
Romanian people of South Korean descent
Romanian women's basketball players
Romanian women's 3x3 basketball players
Shooting guards
South Korean women's basketball players
South Korean women's 3x3 basketball players
Women's Korean Basketball League players
South Korean people of Romanian descent